The United States Air Force's 744th Air Refueling Squadron (744 ARS) was an aerial refueling unit that operated the McDonnell Douglas KC-10 at Seymour Johnson AFB, North Carolina.  The unit was activated on 29 April 1994 to replace the departing 344th Air Refueling Squadron, The unit was inactivated in 1995.

References

Air Refueling
Military units and formations in North Carolina
Military units and formations disestablished in 1995
1995 disestablishments in the United States
Organizations with year of establishment missing